Francis Johnson may refer to:

Politics
 Francis Johnson (MP) (died 1605), English MP for Aldeburgh 1597
 Francis Johnson (congressman) (1776–1842), U.S. Representative from Kentucky
 Francis Godschall Johnson (1817–1894), Canadian politician
 Francis Bulkeley Johnson (1828–1887), member of the Legislative Council of Hong Kong
 Francis Johnson (ILP politician) (1878–1970), British socialist activist with the Independent Labour Party
Francis M. Johnson (1850–1924), Mississippi politician

Sports
 Francis Johnson (cricketer) (1880–1951), Australian cricketer
 Francis Johnson (basketball) (1910–1997), American basketball player and Olympic gold medalist

Other
 Francis Johnson (academic) (fl. 1660), Oxford academic and administrator
 Francis Johnson (architect) (1911–1995), English architect
 Francis Johnson (Brownist) (1562–1618), English Presbyterian separatist minister
 Francis Johnson (composer) (1792–1844), American musician and composer
 Francis Johnson (linguist) (died 1876), linguist who taught at the East India Company College, 1824–1855
 Francis Johnson (Texas) (1799–1884), co-commander of the Texian Army during the Texas Revolution

See also
Thomas Francis Johnson (1909–1988), U.S. Representative from Maryland
Frances Johnson (disambiguation)
Francis Johnston (disambiguation)
Frank Johnson (disambiguation)
Frank Johnston (disambiguation)